CRCP may refer to:
CRCP (gene)
Consumer Rights Commission of Pakistan, NGO in Pakistan
Coral Reef Conservation Program, US NOAA partnership programme
Cardinal Ritter College Prep High School, school in Missouri, United States